De Ateliers (formerly Ateliers '63) is an independent art school in located in Amsterdam. It was founded in Haarlem in 1963, among others by Ger Lataster, Mari Andriessen, Nic Jonk, Theo Mulder and Wessel Couzijn. This "group of established artists... agreed that the formative process of fine artists should be more individually directed than the learning of a trade or the studying of a science."

De Ateliers offers a postgraduate program, where young artists can work in their own workshops with accompanied by renowned artists and critics. Students are called 'participants'. They are regularly visited in their studios by the tutors and guests from The Netherlands and abroad for individual feedbacks.

After many years located in Haarlem, the institute moved to Amsterdam to the former building of the Rijksakademie at the Stadhouderskade in the Amsterdam city center.

Among the accompanying have been: Armando, Stanley Brouwn, Constant Nieuwenhuys, Jan Dibbets, Didier Vermeiren, Edgar Fernhout, Carel Visser, Ger van Elk and Willem de Rooij.

Among the participants of De Ateliers have been: Philip Akkerman, Keren Cytter, Marlene Dumas, Thomas Houseago, Rob Johannesma, Andrew Kerton. Axel en Helena van der Kraan, Joep van Lieshout, and Marc Ruygrok.
The supervisors in 2020-'21 are:

Rob Birza
Dominic van den Boogerd
Varda Caivano
Nina Canell
Pauline Curnier Jardin
Chris Evans 
Martijn Hendriks
David Jablonowski
Marina Pinsky

References

External links 
 Official website

Art schools in the Netherlands